Richmond is a Canadian rural community in Prince County, Prince Edward Island.

Located in a farming area west of Summerside, the community is situated on Route 2 and until 1989 was served by CN Rail.

Communities in Prince County, Prince Edward Island